The siege of Kuwabara took place the day after the siege of Uehara; Takeda Shingen continued to gain power in Shinano Province by seizing Kuwabara castle from Suwa Yorishige. Suwa was escorted back to the provincial capital of Kōfu under "the pretext of safe conduct, but he was then forced to commit suicide."

References
Turnbull, Stephen (1998). 'The Samurai Sourcebook'. London: Cassell & Co.

1542 in Japan
Kuwabara 1542
Kuwabara 1542
Conflicts in 1542